Robert F. Fox (born October 11, 1991), known professionally as Toby Fox (previously Toby "Radiation" Fox), is an American video game developer and video game composer. He is known for developing the role-playing video games Undertale and Deltarune for which the former garnered acclaim and he received nominations for a British Academy Game Award, three Game Awards and D.I.C.E. Awards, the latter known as the video game equivalent of the Academy Awards.

Fox's early work consisted primarily of composing music, notably doing so for the webcomic Homestuck, and, following the success of Undertale, he went on to compose music for a number of other independent video games. Other notable works include contributing to the soundtracks of Super Smash Bros. Ultimate and two Pokémon video games.

Career

Early work and composing 
Toby Fox's earliest well-known work is his "EarthBound Halloween Hack", a Halloween-themed ROM hack of the 1994 Super NES game EarthBound released in 2008. He then moved onto composing a variety of music for Andrew Hussie's 2009 webcomic Homestuck during his senior year of high school. Though he did not initially respond when Hussie started a "Music Contribution Team" in April 2009 and put up a news post asking composers to participate, Hussie took note of his work when Fox started uploading piano covers of the webcomic's music on the MS Paint Adventures forums. Fox has composed music for the 2017 Homestuck video game Hiveswap, Undertale artist Temmie Chang's short narrative game Escaped Chasm, and Game Freak's 2019 RPG Little Town Hero, the last of which was arranged by Pokémon composer Hitomi Sato. He also composed a track for Pokémon Sword and Shield, a vocal song for Itoki Hana's PRAY album, and multiple tracks for Pokémon Scarlet and Violet.

Acclaim and breakthrough

Undertale 

Fox's most well-known work is the 2015 role-playing video game Undertale, which he also composed the soundtrack for. The game sold more than 1 million copies, becoming a "breakout hit" and "pop-culture phenomenon". Fox worked on the entire game independently, besides the art assets—which he asked Temmie (Tuyoki) Chang to help with—to avoid relying on others. He had some experience in game development before Undertale, using RPG Maker 2000 with his three brothers to make role-playing games and EarthBound ROM hacks in high school, the most notable of which was Earthbound: The Halloween Hack. He thought of the character designs and ideas for Undertale while in college, where he drew them in his notebook.

Following its release, Undertale garnered an extensive fanbase. Fox commented that he did not mind if people stated that they did not like the game, saying that it was "not for everyone". Despite Undertales awards and widespread acclaim, Fox wrote that his personal opinion was that the game was still "niche" and deserved an "8/10" review score.

In 2016, Fox released a number of unused musical tracks from Undertale. He also became a contributor to the A Profound Waste of Time magazine. Fox was then chosen to be part of the 2018 Games Forbes 30 Under 30 list for his role in creating Undertale.

The success of Undertale, especially in Japan, afforded Fox the opportunity to visit Super Smash Bros. creator Masahiro Sakurai at his home, where they discussed the series and played Super Smash Bros. Ultimate against each other, and the two reportedly had a very similar skill level, trading wins and losses equally. Sans, a character from Undertale, was later included in Super Smash Bros. Ultimate as a Mii costume available through downloadable content, along with his signature weapon, dubbed the “Gaster Blaster”, and instrumental composition "MEGALOVANIA", for which Fox provided a new arrangement.

Deltarune 

On October 30, 2018, Fox tweeted a request for fans of Undertale to check the game's official Twitter account in 24 hours. The following day, Fox released the first chapter of the followup to Undertale, named Deltarune, (an anagram of undertale) for free under the guise of a "survey". On November 1, Fox shared more details regarding the game, including that the rest of the chapters were expected to release simultaneously, but work had not yet started, and there was no estimated timeframe for completion. Fox also stated that he had been working on the project since 2012, and that the idea for Undertale developed from Deltarune during production. On June 12, 2019, as only the first chapter of Deltarune had been playable for several months, Fox expressed on his Twitter account he had hope he would complete the rest of Deltarune, saying: "Slowly I'm writing and drawing it all out." He stated that he has written "about 50 songs past Chapter 1".

On September 17, 2021, Fox released the second chapter of Deltarune for free since "the world has been really tough for everybody recently", referring to the struggles of the COVID-19 pandemic. He plans to release the next three chapters simultaneously with a price greater than Undertale, but without any projected release date.

Personal life 
Robert F. Fox was born on October 11, 1991 in Manchester, New Hampshire.

He studied environmental science at Northeastern University.

He has chronic wrist and hand pain that regularly disables him from programming and composing; Fox cited a flareup of this pain as a factor in the delayed development of Deltarune second chapter.

Works

References

1991 births
American electronic musicians
American male composers
American video game designers
Indie video game developers
Living people
Musicians with disabilities
Northeastern University alumni
People from New Hampshire
 
Video game composers
Video game directors
Video game writers